Han Yong (1422–1478) was a Chinese politician of the Ming dynasty. He was born in what is now Suzhou, Jiangsu Province. He was the 2nd Viceroy of Liangguang, covering the provinces of Guangdong, Guangxi and Hainan.

Biography

Han Yong obtained his jinshi degree in 1422, and served as a censor. In 1452, he was promoted as the provincial inspector for Jiangxi; during his tenure, he restored the Tengwang Pavilion.

In 1465, he was appointed as military inspector for a campaign, led by Zhao Fu, against a rebellion of Miao peoples in Datengxia (present-day Guiping, Guangxi). On the successful conclusion of the campaign, Han Yong was appointed Viceroy of Liangguang to continue pacification efforts, but eventually retired due to attacks from his subordinates.

1422 births
1478 deaths
Viceroys of Liangguang
Politicians from Suzhou
Ming dynasty politicians